Caramboxin (CBX) is a toxin found in star fruit (Averrhoa carambola).  Individuals with some types of kidney disease are susceptible to adverse neurological effects including intoxication, seizures and even death after eating star fruit. Caramboxin has been identified as the neurotoxin responsible for these effects. Caramboxin is a non-proteinogenic amino acid that stimulates the glutamate receptors in neurons. Its chemical structure is similar to the amino acid phenylalanine. Caramboxin is an agonist of both NMDA and AMPA glutamatergic ionotropic receptors with potent excitatory, convulsant, and neurodegenerative properties.

A possible interaction between caramboxin and oxalic acid in starfruit can lead to both neurotoxic and nephrotoxic effects. Consuming large amounts of starfruit or its juice on an empty stomach is not recommended, even for individuals with normal kidney function.

References

Neurotoxins
Amino acids
Phenols
Benzoic acids
Toxic amino acids
Plant toxins